The Wizard of A.I.D.S.: Aware Individuals Deserving Survival is a short musical play created by the AIDS Educational Theatre (now HealthWorks Theatre) in Chicago in 1987. The play, which parodies the 1939 film The Wizard of Oz, is an AIDS education piece that follows Dorothy Gale and her friends from the "Land of AIDS" as they battle the "Wicked Witch of Unsafe Sex" and learn how to prevent the spread of HIV. Along the way, the Scarecrow learns to use his brain to make good choices to avoid infection, the Tin Man finds it in his heart to feel compassion for people with the disease and the Cowardly Lion realizes the courage to face his fears about becoming ill. The musical plays on the popularity of the film among gay people, a group of high risk for AIDS infection. During and after the play, cast members distribute HIV-prevention literature and condoms to the audience.

Aiming for an audience of teenagers and young adults, HealthWorks tours the piece to high schools and college campuses across the country, occasionally sparking controversy. Although Dorothy chooses abstinence as her prevention strategy, the play frankly discusses condom usage and the Wicked Witch is killed by being suffocated with a giant condom.

References

External links
 HealthWorks Theatre official site 

1987 musicals
HIV/AIDS in theatre
LGBT-related musicals
Musicals based on The Wizard of Oz